Vene (Finnish: Boat) is a Finnish language boating magazine based in Helsinki, Finland. The magazine is owned by Otava Media and published by Otavamedia Oy. It is published twelve times per year and targets those who have interest in water sports. It covers articles providing new ideas for upcoming boat trips, equipment refurbishment or equipment related to the water sports.

References

External links
 

Boating magazines
Finnish-language magazines
Hobby magazines
Magazines published in Helsinki
Monthly magazines published in Finland
Magazines with year of establishment missing